Glenn Donaldson is an American musician most notable for his band The Reds, Pinks and Purples. The Reds, Pinks and Purples 4th release, Summer at Land's End' was Bandcamp's album of the day for January 28, 2022.

He is also associated with Jewelled Antler and his collaborations with Loren Chasse, Steven R. Smith and others in such projects as Thuja, The Skygreen Leopards, The Blithe Sons & Flying Canyon as well as his solo projects The Birdtree and The Ivytree. Donaldson is also a prolific collage artist, and his surrealist-inspired nature collages grace the covers of many of the Jewelled Antler albums.

References

External links
Reds, Pinks and Purples Bandcamp
2004 interview
Perfect Sound Forever article 
SF Weekly article
2008 interview
Ptolemaic Terrascope Online 2005 interview
Discography

American folk musicians
Psychedelic folk musicians
Living people
Place of birth missing (living people)
1972 births